Asman Ridge is a serrate ridge about  long on the south side of Arthur Glacier, just north of Bailey Ridge in the Ford Ranges, Marie Byrd Land. It was discovered in 1934 on aerial flights of the Byrd Antarctic Expedition, and named by the United States Antarctic Service (USAS) (1939–41) for Adam Asman, a member of the USAS West Base party.

See also
Mount Byrd

References
 

Ridges of Marie Byrd Land